What It's All About is an album by trumpeter Roy Eldridge recorded in 1976 and released by the Pablo label.

Reception

AllMusic reviewer Scott Yanow stated "What It's All About is swinging, building up solos to potentially ferocious levels and going for broke. That was always the philosophy that Roy Eldridge followed and, even though it was rather late in his career by the time he recorded this Pablo set, he was still pushing himself".

Track listing
All compositions by Roy Eldridge except where noted
 "I Still Love Him So" (Benny Carter) – 6:12
 "The Heat's On" – 6:43
 "That Thing" – 8:19
 "Recado Bossa Nova"  (Luiz Antônio, Djalma Ferreira, Paul Francis Webster) – 6:40
 "Melange" – 13:10

Personnel 
Roy Eldridge – trumpet
Norris Turney – alto saxophone
Budd Johnson – tenor saxophone
Milt Jackson – vibraphone (tracks 4 & 5)
Norman Simmons – piano
Ted Sturgis – bass
Eddie Locke – drums

References 

1976 albums
Roy Eldridge albums
Pablo Records albums
Albums produced by Norman Granz